Ormetica orbona is a moth of the family Erebidae. It was described by William Schaus in 1889. It is found in Mexico.

References

Ormetica
Moths described in 1889